Muhurr is a village and a former municipality in the Dibër County, northeastern Albania. At the 2015 local government reform it became a subdivision of the municipality Dibër. The population at the 2011 census was 2,780.

Demographic history
Muhurr (Muhur) appears in the Ottoman defter of 1467 as a settlement in the vilayet of Lower Dibra. The village had a total of 18 households which were represented by the following household heads: Pop Llazari, son of Gjoni; Stanisha, son of Leka; Martini, son of Gjoni; Kola, son of Nikolla; Llazari, son of Vlashi; Dimitri, son of Gjoni; Andrea, son of Llazari; Pop Mëhilli; Gjoni, son of Gjergji; Gjoni, son of Leka; Leka, son of Gjergji; Llazari, son of Dimitri; Gjoni, son of Leka; Gjini, son of Progoni; Lumsha, son of Gjoni; Todori, son of Gjoni; Gjoni, son of Mizi; and Sik Marini.

References

Former municipalities in Dibër County
Administrative units of Dibër (municipality)
Villages in Dibër County